Jean Selic (born 16 August 1934) is a French racing cyclist. He rode in the 1962 Tour de France.

References

External links
 

1934 births
Living people
French male cyclists
Place of birth missing (living people)
Tour de Suisse stage winners